Tregoodwell is a hamlet half a mile east of Camelford in Cornwall, England, UK. It is on the road towards Rough Tor.

References

Hamlets in Cornwall
Camelford